Kwaku Sekyi-Appiah (born 13 January 1910) is a Ghanaian politician who was a member of the first parliament of the second Republic of Ghana. He represented Asikuma-Brakwa constituency under the membership of the progress party (PP).

Early life and education 
Sekyi-Appiah was born on 13 January 1910. He attended Wesleyan School. He worked as a Farmer and Businessman before going into Parliament.

Personal life 
Sekyi-Appiah was a Christian.

Politics 
Sekyi-Appiah began his political career in 1969 when he became the parliamentary candidate for the Progress Party (PP) to represent his constituency in the Central Region of Ghana prior to the commencement of the 1969 Ghanaian parliamentary election.

Sekyi-Appiah was sworn into the First Parliament of the Second Republic of Ghana on 1 October 1969, after being pronounced winner at the 1969 Ghanaian election held on 26 August 1969 and was later suspended following the overthrow of the Busia government on 13 January 1972.

Sekyi-Appiah was the Chairman of the Odoben Town Investigation Committee in 1969.

References 

1910 births
Possibly living people
Ghanaian MPs 1969–1972